Archippus (Ancient Greek: Ἄρχιππος, "master of the horse") was an early Christian believer mentioned briefly in the New Testament epistles of Philemon and Colossians.

Role in the New Testament
In Paul's letter to Philemon, Archippus is named once alongside Philemon and Apphia as a host of the church, and a "fellow soldier." In  (ascribed to Paul), the church is instructed to tell Archippus to "Take heed to the ministry which thou hast received in the Lord, that thou fulfil it."

Role in tradition
According to the 4th century Apostolic Constitutions (7.46), Archippus was the first bishop of Laodicea in Phrygia (now part of Turkey). The Roman Catholic Church observes a feast day for Saint Archippus on March 20. The Eastern Orthodox Church observes a feast day on February 19 as well as November 22 along with Saints Philemon, Apphia, and Onesimus. According to tradition, he was stoned to death.

See also 
 Colossians 4

External links
 St. Archippus catholic.org
 http://www.santiebeati.it/dettaglio/92998
 https://www.johnsanidopoulos.com/2018/02/holy-apostle-archippus-of-seventy.html

Seventy disciples
People in the Pauline epistles
Saints from Roman Anatolia
1st-century bishops in Roman Anatolia
Epistle to the Colossians
Epistle to Philemon
People from Colossae